Mollaköy is a municipality (belde) in the Erzincan District, Erzincan Province, Turkey. The village is populated by Kurds of the Keman tribe and had a population of 1,477 in 2021. It is divided into the neighborhoods of Atatürk, Cumhuriyet, Mahmutlu, Tepecik and Yeşilyurt.

References 

Towns in Turkey
Populated places in Erzincan Province
Kurdish settlements in Erzincan Province